Prey Kabbas District is a district located in Takeo Province, in southern Cambodia. According to the 1998 census of Cambodia, it had a population of 85,880.

Administration
As of 2019, Prey Kabbas District has 13 communes, 110 villages.

References 

 
Districts of Takéo province